Hossein Khanzadi is an Iranian hovercraft pilot in the regular military (Artesh) who served as the Commander of the Islamic Republic of Iran Navy from November 2017 to August 2021. On 17 August 2021, Rear Admiral Khanzadi was replaced by Shahram Irani, the first Sunni high ranking commander on the orders of the Supreme Leader Ayatollah Sayed Ali Khamenei.

References

Living people
Islamic Republic of Iran Navy commodores
Commanders of Islamic Republic of Iran Navy
Year of birth missing (living people)
People from Gorgan